The 2010 J. League Cup, more widely known as the 2010 J.League Yamazaki Nabisco Cup, was the 35th edition of the most prestigious Japanese soccer league cup tournament and the 18th edition under the current J. League Cup format. It began on 31 March 2010 with the first matches of the group stage and ended on 3 November 2010 with the Final at National Olympic Stadium, Tokyo.

Teams from the J1 took part in the tournament. Kashima Antlers, Kawasaki Frontale, Sanfrecce Hiroshima and Gamba Osaka were given a bye to the quarter-final due to the qualification for the AFC Champions League group stage. The remaining 14 teams started from the group stage, where they were divided into two groups of seven. The group winners and the runners-up of each group qualified for the quarter-final along with the four teams which qualified for the AFC Champions League.

The competition was won by Júbilo Iwata, who defeated Sanfrecce Hiroshima 5–3 after extra time. They qualified for the 2011 Suruga Bank Championship.

Group stage

Group A

Group B

Knockout stage 
All times are Japan Standard Time (UTC+9)

Quarterfinals

First leg

Second leg 

Kawasaki Frontale won 4-3 on aggregate.

Júbilo Iwata won 2-1 on aggregate.

Sanfrecce Hiroshima won by away goals rule (2-2 on aggregate).

Shimizu S-Pulse won by away goals rule (1-1 on aggregate).

Semifinals

First leg

Second leg 

Júbilo Iwata won 3-2 on aggregate.

Sanfrecce Hiroshima won 3-2 on aggregate.

Final

Top goalscorers

References 
 J.League Official Site 

Cup
2010
2010 domestic association football cups